McFie is a surname. Notable people with the surname include:

Hector McFie (1898–1982), Australian politician
Helen McFie (born 1945), British rower
Henry McFie (1869–1957), Australian politician

See also
McFee